Piotr Czaja (born 11 February 1944) is a Polish footballer. He played in two matches for the Poland national football team in 1970.

References

External links
 
 

1944 births
Living people
Polish footballers
Poland international footballers
People from Teltow-Fläming
Association football goalkeepers
GKS Katowice players
Ruch Chorzów players